Carroll Barse Haff (February 19, 1892 – April 9, 1947) was an American track and field athlete who competed in the 1912 Summer Olympics. He was born in Kansas City, Missouri and died in Pelham Manor, New York.

In 1912 he finished fifth in the 400 metres competition. Haff also competed in the exhibition baseball tournament at the 1912 Olympics.

References

External links

1892 births
1947 deaths
American male sprinters
Baseball players from Kansas City, Missouri
Olympic track and field athletes of the United States
Olympic baseball players of the United States
Athletes (track and field) at the 1912 Summer Olympics
Baseball players at the 1912 Summer Olympics
Track and field athletes from Kansas City, Missouri
People from Pelham Manor, New York